Wayne County may refer to:

Counties in the United States
Wayne County, Georgia
Wayne County, Illinois
Wayne County, Indiana
Wayne County, Iowa
Wayne County, Kentucky
Wayne County, Michigan
Wayne County, Mississippi
Wayne County, Missouri
Wayne County, Nebraska
Wayne County, New York
Wayne County, North Carolina
Wayne County, Ohio
Wayne County, Pennsylvania
Wayne County, Tennessee
Wayne County, Utah
Wayne County, West Virginia

Entertainment
Wayne County & the Electric Chairs, an American punk rock band
Wayne County (now Jayne County), an American musician in the above band